Osterbek is a river of Hamburg, Germany. The Osterbek has its source at Farmsen-Berne in the Hamburg borough of Wandsbek. After crossing into the borough of Hamburg-Nord, the Osterbek becomes navigable as Osterbekkanal. It joins the Alster at Außenalster, between the districts Winterhude and Uhlenhorst.

See also
List of rivers of Hamburg

References

Gesamtliste der Fließgewässer im Elbeeinzugsgebiet, Flussgebietsgemeinschaft Elbe (FGG), Magdeburg, 2010

Wandsbek
Hamburg-Nord
Rivers of Hamburg
Rivers of Germany